Penicillium rugulosum is an anamorph species of fungus in the genus Penicillium which produces inulinase, luteoskyrin and (+) rugulosin.

Further reading

References 

rugulosum
Fungi described in 1910
Taxa named by Charles Thom